Orthodox Catholic Church or Orthodox Catholic may refer to:
 The Catholic Church
 The Eastern Catholic Churches, particularly the Greek Catholic Churches
 The Eastern Orthodox Church
 The Oriental Orthodox Churches
 The Orthodox-Catholic Church of America
 The Catholicate of the West, also called The Western Orthodox Catholic Church

See also
Catholic (disambiguation)
Catholic (term)
Orthodox (disambiguation)
Church (disambiguation)
Catholic Church (disambiguation)
Orthodox Church (disambiguation)
Orthodoxy
Catholicity